Louisburg is a town in Franklin County, North Carolina,  United States. As of the 2020 census, the town population was 3,064. It is the county seat of Franklin County. The town is located approximately 29 miles northeast of the state capital, Raleigh, and located about 31 miles south of the Virginia border. It is also the home of Louisburg College, the oldest two-year coeducational college in the United States.

History
Louisburg was established in 1779 and named in honor of King Louis XVI of France, who was aiding the American Revolution at the time.  Louisburg was established on land purchased for the erection of a courthouse.

In June 1965, the local newspaper and radio station publicized the names and addresses of African-American families who had applied to attend white schools in Franklin County. The families were attacked on numerous occasions by white extremists, who fired into their homes or destroyed their cars. In the summer of 1966, a series of cross burnings were perpetrated by the Ku Klux Klan in Franklin County, including one in front of the County Board of Education in Louisburg.

Geography

Climate 
Like the rest of eastern North Carolina, Louisburg has a humid subtropical climate (Köppen climate classification Cfa), with cool to mild winters and hot, humid summers. Rainfall - which is mainly produced by afternoon thunderstorms - is highest in the summer months. Snowfall is light and infrequent, with an average of 1.7 inches (4.32 cm) per year.

Demographics

2020 census

As of the 2020 United States census, there were 3,064 people, 1,250 households, and 798 families residing in the town.

2010 census
As of the census of 2010, there were 3,359 people, 1,197 households, and 654 families residing in the town. The population density was 1,199.6 people per square mile (460.1/km2). The racial makeup of the town was 47.3% White, 46.9% African American, 0.3% Native American, 0.9% Asian, 0.0% Pacific Islander, 2.9% from other races, and 1.7% from two or more races. Hispanic or Latino of any race were 5.5% of the population.

There were 1,197 households, out of which 23.0% had children under the age of 18 living with them, 28.6% were married couples living together, 20.6% had a female householder with no husband present, and 45.4% were non-families. 40.3% of all households were made up of individuals, and 21.4% had someone living alone who was 65 years of age or older. The average household size was 2.17 and the average family size was 2.94.

In the town, the population was spread out, with 29.4% under the age of 20, 10.7% from 20 to 24, 15.8% from 25 to 44, 22.7% from 45 to 64, and 21.5% who were 65 years of age or older. The median age was 38.2 years. For every 100 females, there were 89.8 males. For every 100 females age 18 and over, there were 91.3 males.

The median income for a household in the town was $27,325, and the median income for a family was $72,583. Males had a median income of $49,375 versus $35,104 for females. The per capita income for the town was $18,529. About 15.7% of families and 23.7% of the population were below the poverty line, including 27.3% of those under age 18 and 19.8% of those age 65 or over.

Housing
There were 1,345 housing units at an average density of 480.4 per square mile (184.2/km2). 11.0% of housing units were vacant.

There were 1,197 occupied housing units in the town. 511 were owner-occupied units (42.7%), while 686 were renter-occupied (57.3%). The homeowner vacancy rate was 4.7% of total units. The rental unit vacancy rate was 5.5%.

Arts and culture

Historic sites
Cascine, Cooke House, Dean Farm, Franklin County Training School-Riverside Union School, Fuller House, Green Hill House, Louisburg Historic District, Main Building, Louisburg College, Massenburg Plantation, Person Place, Portridge, Rose Hill, Patty Person Taylor House, Thomas and Lois Wheless House, and Williamson House are listed on the National Register of Historic Places.

Franklin County Library
The county's main, or central, library is the Franklin County Library, located in Louisburg.  There are three branches in other municipalities across the county as well as an outreach program through the Bookmobile.

Government

Louisburg is governed by a mayor and town council.  The town council has seven elected members, who all live within the Louisburg corporate limits. Councilmembers serve four year terms.  The mayor is Christopher Neal, who was elected in 2021.

Mayor: Christopher L. Neal
Town Administrator (Interim): Jonathan Barlow
Councilwoman: Betty Wright
Councilman: Tom Clancy
Councilman: Bobby Dickerson
Councilman: Mark Russell
Councilwoman: Silke Stein
Councilwoman: Emma Stewart

Education

Franklin County Schools
The main office buildings of Franklin County Schools are located at 53 West River Road, Louisburg NC 27549 in the former Franklin County Training School-Riverside Union School.  Franklin County Schools (FCS) consists of 15 schools and more than 8,500 students serving the towns of Franklinton, Louisburg, Youngsville and Bunn. There are eight elementary schools, three middle schools, three high schools, and one alternative school.

Louisburg College
A two-year residential college located in Louisburg, North Carolina, that  focuses on getting students ready for the next step to a four-year school offering baccalaureate degrees.  The three degree programs offered:  an Associate in Arts (general college degree), an Associate in Science (general science degree), and an Associate in Business degree. It also offers these special programs:  Academy (tutoring support for ALL students), the Learning Partners Program (for students with learning disabilities and/or ADHD), and the Crossroads Program (for first-year students as they handle the transition from high school).
Louisburg College has comprehensive transfer agreements with many public and private colleges and universities, including the 16 branches of the University of North Carolina system, that allow Louisburg College graduates to make a seamless transition upon entering four-year schools as full-fledged juniors.

Infrastructure

Louisburg Police Department
The Louisburg Police Department was founded in 1779.

Notable person
 Thomas W. Bickett, governor of North Carolina

References

 William S. Powell, The North Carolina Gazetteer: A Dictionary of Tar Heel Places, 1968, The University of North Carolina Press at Chapel Hill, Library of Congress Catalog Card #28-25916, page 301. Retrieved Jan. 15, 2015.

External links

Towns in Franklin County, North Carolina
Towns in North Carolina
County seats in North Carolina
Populated places established in 1779
1779 establishments in North Carolina